The 2002–03 season was the 118th season in the existence of FC Porto and the club's 88th consecutive season in the top flight of Portuguese football. In addition to the domestic league, Porto participated in this season's editions of the Taça de Portugal and the UEFA Cup.

Players

First-team squad
Squad at end of season

Transfers

Competitions

Overall record

Primeira Liga

League table

Results summary

Results by round

Matches

Taça de Portugal

UEFA Cup

First round

Second round

Third round

Fourth round

Quarter-finals

Semi-final

Final

References

FC Porto seasons
Benfica
Portuguese football championship-winning seasons
UEFA Europa League-winning seasons